Foel Penolau is a mountain close to Moel Ysgyfarnogod in Snowdonia, North Wales and is the northernmost summit of the Rhinogydd, and overlooks Llyn Trawsfynydd.  From the summit it is possible to see the towns of Porthmadog and Blaenau Ffestiniog.  As a result of a revised survey of its topographical prominence, Foel Penolau gained Hewitt and Simms status in December 2018 when its prominence was measured to be above .

The top of Foel Penolau is reputed to be one of the rockiest summits in Snowdonia, where hands must be used to attain the summit. The summit is on a large smooth slab of rock which is the surface of the outcrop from which the top was formed.

References

External links
www.geograph.co.uk : photos of Moel Ysgyfarnogod and surrounding area

Talsarnau
Trawsfynydd
Mountains and hills of Gwynedd
Mountains and hills of Snowdonia
Hewitts of Wales
Nuttalls